WTKF (107.1 FM) is a radio station broadcasting a talk radio format. Licensed to Atlantic, North Carolina, United States, it serves the Morehead City-New Bern-Jacksonville area. WTKF signed on in 1992 as North Carolina's first FM talk-formatted station. It grew from the now-defunct WBTB/1400, which was licensed to Beaufort, North Carolina. As the first radio station in North Carolina to broadcast a talk format on FM radio, it boasted the slogan "First In Talk". In 2002, WTKF began simulcasting its signal on Jacksonville, North Carolina's WJNC AM 1240.  On January 22, 2008, WTKF shifted from its 7,000-watt signal at 107.3 FM to a more-powerful 46,000-watt signal at 107.1 FM. The station is currently owned by Atlantic Ridge Telecasters.

External links
Official Website

TKF
Talk radio stations in the United States